The Cheile Bicazului - Hășmaș (Bicaz Gorges - Hășmaș Mountains) National Park  is located in north-eastern Romania, in the Eastern Carpathians mountain chain. The reservation territory is part of Neamț and Harghita counties.

The park administration is located in Izvoru Mureșului, in Harghita County.

The park's most important geologic features are:
Cheile Bicazului (Bicaz Gorges), a deep canyon dug by the river Bicaz
Lacu Roșu (the Red Lake) – a natural dam lake
Hășmaș Mountains

Natural reserves: 
Bicaz Gorge (Neamț County – 1,600 hectares and Harghita County – 2,128 hectares)
Lacu Roșu
 (10 hectares)
 (5 hectares)
Hășmașul Mare Massif, Piatra Singuratică (the Lonely Stone) and Hășmașul Negru (800 hectares)

References

External links
 Park's website

National parks of Romania
Protected areas of the Eastern Carpathians
Geography of Neamț County
Geography of Harghita County
Tourist attractions in Neamț County
Tourist attractions in Harghita County